Thomas Reynolds (2 October 1922 – March 1998) was an English footballer who played for Sunderland and Darlington in the Football League as a winger.

Club career
He joined Sunderland from youth club Felling Juniors, and made his debut against Charlton Athletic on 11 September 1946 in a 5–0 defeat at The Valley. Raised in the North East, he raced his own greyhounds at the local dog track. He left Sunderland for King's Lynn, after spending from 1946 until 1953 at the club, scoring 18 goals with 167 league appearances.

He then made 43 league appearances for Darlington.

He also managed a number of pubs, notably the North Moor in Sunderland, now demolished, and The Bush in the Hendon area of the town.

References

1922 births
1998 deaths
Footballers from Gateshead
English footballers
Association football outside forwards
Sunderland A.F.C. players
King's Lynn F.C. players
Darlington F.C. players
English Football League players
21st-century American politicians